Karel Pacák (born 19 April 1896, date of death unknown) was a Czech long-distance runner. He competed in the men's 5000 metres at the 1920 Summer Olympics.

References

1896 births
Year of death missing
Athletes (track and field) at the 1920 Summer Olympics
Czech male long-distance runners
Olympic athletes of Czechoslovakia
Sportspeople from Liberec